Valentin Lupașcu (born 18 November 1975) is a Moldovan former footballer who played as a defender.

International career
Valentin Lupașcu played one friendly game at international level for Moldova, when he came as a substitute and replaced Oleg Șișchin in the 89th minute of a match against Hungary which ended 1–1.

Honours
Nistru Otaci
Cupa Moldovei: 2004–05

References

1975 births
Living people
Moldovan footballers
Moldova international footballers
Association football defenders
Moldovan Super Liga players
Liga I players
FC Spumante Cricova players
FC Nistru Otaci players
ASC Oțelul Galați players
FC Rubin Kazan players
CS Tiligul-Tiras Tiraspol players
Moldovan expatriate footballers
Expatriate footballers in Romania
Moldovan expatriate sportspeople in Romania
Expatriate footballers in Russia
Expatriate sportspeople in Russia
Moldovan expatriates in Russia
Moldovan expatriate sportspeople in Russia